The  is a river in Naha, Okinawa, and is the hydrographic resource for domestic urban fresh water. The river flows into the East China Sea.

Poisoning
The river and people living around it suffered when pentachlorophenol herbicides were dumped into the river, obtained from the U.S. military by a civilian company in 1971, when it was still a US territory.   Some 30,000 Okinawans had used the river for water supply, which was halted when school children came down with abdominal pain and nausea.  Okinawa continues to suffer from extremely elevated levels of dioxins far beyond allowed limits, from the areas in and surrounding its US military bases, which are adjacent urban population centers, despite decades of denials and cleanup refusals by US officials.

References

Environmental disasters in Japan
Rivers of Okinawa Prefecture
Rivers of Japan